Rag, Tag and Bobtail is a BBC children's television programme that ran from 1953 to 1965 as the Thursday programme in the weekly cycle of Watch With Mother. The scripts were written by Louise Cochrane, and the series was produced by Freda Lingstrom and David Boisseau. Narration was by Charles E. Stidwell, David Enders, and James Urquhart.

The three main characters are Rag, a hedgehog; Tag, a mouse; and Bobtail, a rabbit; five baby rabbits also appeared occasionally. All the characters are glove puppets, created and operated by Sam and Elizabeth Williams. The stories were simple and there were no catch-phrases as there were in other programmes in the cycle, but the series is still remembered with affection. Twenty-six 12-minute episodes were made, two of which were never broadcast, each shot in a single take.

The repeat showings came to an end in December 1965, replaced by Tales of the Riverbank (moved from its normal Monday slot by Camberwick Green).

In 1987, a Watch With Mother video was released by the BBC. The episode of Rag, Tag and Bobtail featured a scene in which Bobtail discovered that the baby rabbits had been playing in a muddy pool and had turned black.  He was unable to clean them, but in the end the mud was washed off.

References
Notes

Bibliography

External links
Video clip

1950s British children's television series
1960s British children's television series
1953 British television series debuts
1965 British television series endings
British television shows featuring puppetry
BBC children's television shows
Television series about hedgehogs
Television series about mice and rats
Television series about rabbits and hares